Agrinar SA is an Argentine agricultural machinery manufacturing company based in the city of Granadero Baigorria in Santa Fe Province, Argentina. The company focuses on agricultural vehicles, producing mainly tractors but also combine harvesters and backhoe loaders.

It was founded in 2002, utilizing a former Massey Ferguson factory and designs. A lawsuit from AGCO, Massey Ferguson's parent company, brought about design changes.

Products

Tractors 

 T-85 2WD / 4WD 
 T-100
 T-100 Super Alto 
 T-110 
 T-120 2WD / 4WD 
 T-150 
 T-170 
 T-180 
 TA 215

Combine harvesters 
Commercialised under the Marani Agrimar name:
 AXIAL 3000 12s 
 3000 
 2121 M 10S 
 2140 HEE 12S Evolución 5

Heavy machinery 
 CR-90 
 MC 55 / 65 / 80

References

External links 
 

Tractor manufacturers of Argentina
Argentine brands
Materfer